"Dirty Dawg" is a song by American boyband NKOTB (formerly New Kids on the Block), which became their final single to chart on the US Billboard Hot 100 until the 2008 single "Summertime". It was featured on their 1994 album Face the Music. The lead vocals were sung by Jordan Knight and Donnie Wahlberg rapped in the song, but he rapped only small bits during the instrumental breaks. There was another rap in the song featured by the former East Coast hip hop duo Nice & Smooth.

The song peaked on the Billboard Hot 100 at number 66. It broke the top 40 in the United Kingdom and peaked at number 27.
"Dirty Dawg" contains a sample of "That's the Way Love Goes", as performed by Janet Jackson.

Critical reception
Tony Cross from Smash Hits gave the song four out of five, writing, "NKOTB have been as reliable as a fake Rolex recently. But from the moment Dirty Dawg literally barks out of the speakers you'll know they are back. Harder and better than anything else they've done, Dirty Dawg sees the Oldish Kids taking their pop talent, mixing in a dash of Cypress Hill and coming up with a growling groove that East 17's Lecy would be proud of."

Music video
The accompanying music video (directed by Scott Kalvert) starts off with a young woman running through the forest with a search dog barking after her. Then the scene switches back and forth from the band attending a party being held at a brothel to a construction site where the group raps and dances. Towards the end, Nice & Smooth appear to give a rap cameo, while the group breakdances.

The Canadian station MuchMusic banned the video from appearing on its schedule, due to the suggested violence and misogynistic themes.

Track listings
 US 12" vinyl
"Dirty Dawg" (LP Version) – 4:12 
"Dirty Dawg" (Radio Version No Rap) – 3:16
"Dirty Dawg" (Greg Nice Remix) – 4:46 
"Dirty Dawg" (Barbosa / Liggett House Mix) – 7:03 
"Dirty Dawg" (Liggett / Barbosa Hip Hop Mix) – 5:01

 UK limited edition 7" vinyl with poster bag
"Dirty Dawg" (LP Version) – 4:12 
"Dirty Dawg" (Radio Version No Rap) – 3:16

Charts

References

1994 singles
New Kids on the Block songs
Columbia Records singles
Songs written by Jordan Knight
Songs written by Donnie Wahlberg
1993 songs